Revolutionary Middle Class (Spanish: Clase Media Revolucionaria) is a left-wing political party in Venezuela. It was founded on August 7, 2006 as the electoral arm of the Positive Middle Class movement.  It supports President Hugo Chávez.  In the first election it participated in the party obtained 68,283 votes (0.59%).

The Secretary-General of Revolutionary Middle Class is Reinaldo Quijada.

External links
Official website

2006 establishments in Venezuela
Bolivarian Revolution
Political parties established in 2006
Political parties in Venezuela
Socialist parties in Venezuela